The 1998 Giro d'Italia was the 81st edition of the Giro d'Italia, one of cycling's Grand Tours. The Giro began in Nice, France, with a Prologue individual time trial on 16 May, and Stage 11 occurred on 27 May with a stage to San Marino. The race finished in Milan on 7 June.

Prologue
16 May 1998 — Nice to Nice,  (ITT)

Stage 1
17 May 1998 — Nice to Cuneo,

Stage 2
18 May 1998 — Alba to Imperia,

Stage 3
19 May 1998 — Rapallo to Forte dei Marmi,

Stage 4
20 May 1998 — Viareggio to Monte Argentario,

Stage 5
21 May 1998 — Orbetello to Frascati,

Stage 6
22 May 1998 — Maddaloni to Lago Laceno,

Stage 7
23 May 1998 — Montella to Matera,

Stage 8
24 May 1998 — Matera to Lecce,

Stage 9
25 May 1998 — Foggia to Vasto,

Stage 10
26 May 1998 — Vasto to Macerata,

Stage 11
27 May 1998 — Macerata to San Marino,

References

1998 Giro d'Italia
Giro d'Italia stages